Ashburnham may refer to:

 Ashburnham, East Sussex, England
 Ashburnham Place, a country house in that village, the ancestral home of the Ashburnham family
 Ashburnham, Massachusetts, United States
 Ashburnham, Ontario, Canada, a village annexed by the city of Peterborough in 1904
 Ashburnham (surname)
 Earl of Ashburnham
 John Ashburnham (disambiguation)
 Ashburnham baronets
 Ashburnham House, London, place of the 1731 Ashburnham House fire.